Bruno Pezzella (born 22 December 1988 in Bahía Blanca, Argentina) is an Argentine footballer currently playing for Messina of the Serie D in Italy.

Career
Born in Bahía Blanca, Pezzella began playing football in the youth system of local side Club Olimpo alongside his brother, Germán. He played for several clubs in Argentina, including a brief spell in the Primera B Nacional with Club y Biblioteca Ramón Santamarina. Compatriot Sergio Bernardo Almirón brought him to Sicilian club S.S. Akragas Città dei Templi in 2016.

Teams
  Club Bella Vista 2005–2010
  Luján de Cuyo 2010
  Central Español 2011
  Belgrano de Córdoba 2011–2012
  San Luis de Quillota 2012
  Unión La Calera 2013
  Club Almagro 2013–2014
  Club y Biblioteca Ramón Santamarina 2015
  Deportivo Roca 2016
  S.S. Akragas 2016–2017
  Messina 2017–

References

 
 

1988 births
Living people
Argentine footballers
Argentine expatriate footballers
Club Atlético Belgrano footballers
Central Español players
San Luis de Quillota footballers
Primera B de Chile players
Argentine Primera División players
Expatriate footballers in Chile
Expatriate footballers in Uruguay
Bella Vista de Bahía Blanca footballers
S.S. Akragas Città dei Templi players
Association football midfielders
Sportspeople from Bahía Blanca